Sabadini is an Italian surname. Notable people with the surname include:

Bernardo Sabadini (died 1718), Italian opera composer
Gaetano Sabadini (1703–1731), Italian Baroque painter
Giuseppe Sabadini (born 1949), Italian footballer and manager
Irene Sabadini Italian mathematician

See also
Sabatini (disambiguation)

Italian-language surnames